The 1941–42 Yorkshire Cup was the thirty-fourth occasion on which the Yorkshire Cup competition had been held. Organised by the Rugby Football League (RFL), the Yorkshire Cup was a knock-out competition between the professional rugby league clubs from the county of Yorkshire.  Under the wartime emergency rules the RFL was operating to, teams from Lancashire were invited to participate as the Lancashire Cup was not played. The Cup was played for by 14 teams from Yorkshire and two from Lancashire.

Played during October to December 1941 and comprised three two-legged rounds followed by the final. The final was played at Fartown, Huddersfield. Bradford Northern retained the trophy by beating Halifax 24–0 in front of a crowd of 5,989 with receipts were £635.

Participation
In making plans for the 1941–42 season the RFL decided to move the dates of the competition back to the traditional playing period of autumn. In the previous season, the Lancashire Cup was abandoned and the few Lancashire clubs playing during the war were invited to play in the Yorkshire Cup instead, this invitation was continued for 1941–42.  Wigan and Oldham of the three Lancashire teams playing during the season accepted the invite while St Helens declined to take part.

Format
With 14 Yorkshire clubs and two Lancashire clubs in the draw, the format did not require any byes being required. The decision was made to play all ties, except the final, as two-legs (home and away). The competition was played over consecutive weeks commencing 25 October with the final on 6 December.  All the fixtures for all three rounds of the competition were drawn at the same time.

First round
The first leg ties were all played on Saturday 25 October 1941.

The return legs were played the following weekend on Saturday 1 November 1941.

Second round
The first leg ties were all played on Saturday 8 November 1941.

Semi-finals

Final 

On the Monday following the semi-finals, the cup committee met to decide the venue for the final. The decision made was to play the game at Huddersfield's Fartown Ground with Mr G.S. Phillips as referee.  Kick-off time was scheduled for 3:00 pm to allow for extra-time of 10-minutes each way to be played, if needed, and the game still finish in daylight. If the scores were still level after 20-minutes of extra-time then the game would proceed as sudden death, with the first team to score being declared the winners.

The local rivals met in a game that journalists expected to be a close match. 

With both teams featuring guest players, the first half was the close matched game expected and it was only shortly before half-time when the first points were scored as Bradford's Willie Davies made the most of a Halifax error to score a try. With the conversion being kicked, Bradford had a 5–0 lead at the interval.

The second half was a one-sided affair, Davies scored his second try from the first scrum of the half. This was followed by tries from Best, Carter, Foster and Smith with two conversions added.  Although Halifax had a majority of possession in the second half, it was Bradford who did the attacking with Halifax once once getting anywhere close to scoring. 

The receipts for the final were £635.

References

Yorkshire Cup 2
1941 Yorkshire Cup 2